Kapantay ay Langit  is a 1994 Philippine film co-written and directed by Joel Lamangan

Plot 
The story revolves around Odette (Sharon Cuneta) a single mother who closed her heart from love. Her daughter, Cristy (Charina Scott) played matchmaker to Steve (Richard Gomez), an advertising executive whom the young girl believes to be the right person for her mother.

Cast 
 Sharon Cuneta as Odette
 Richard Gomez as Steve
 Bing Loyzaga as Leleng
 Liza Lorena as Mrs. Camua
 Tonton Gutierrez as Frank 
 Subas Herrero as Mr. Yuson
 Rosemarie Gil as Mrs. Yuson
 Charina Scott as Cristina

Production 
The film was produced by Viva Films, with the color processing by LVN Studios. Sampaguita Pictures was in-charge for the post-production facilities while Viva Films for the film facilities. It was released on 9 February 1994.

References

External links
 

Films directed by Joel Lamangan